Rize District (also: Merkez, meaning "central") is a district of the Rize Province of Turkey. Its seat is the city of Rize. Its area is 253 km2, and its population is 150,414 (2021).

Composition
There are four municipalities in Rize District:
 Kendirli
 Muradiye
 Rize
 Salarha

There are 60 villages in Rize District:

 Akarsu
 Akpınar
 Aktaş
 Ambarlık
 Ayane
 Azaklıhoca
 Balıkçılar
 Beştepe
 Bıldırcınköy
 Boğaz
 Camidağı
 Çaybaşı
 Çaycılar
 Çimenli
 Derebaşı
 Dörtyol
 Düzköy
 Elmalı
 Erenköy
 Gölgeli
 Güzelköy
 Güzelyurt
 Karasu
 Karayemiş
 Ketenli
 Kırklartepesi
 Kocatepe
 Köprülü
 Küçükçayır
 Küçükköy
 Kurtuluş
 Melek
 Ortapazar
 Örnek
 Pazarköy
 Pekmezli
 Pınarbaşı
 Selimiye
 Soğukçeşme
 Söğütlü
 Sütlüce
 Taşköprü
 Taşlık
 Taşpınar
 Tekke
 Topkaya
 Tuğlalı
 Üçkaya
 Uzunköy
 Veliköy
 Yemişlik
 Yenidoğan
 Yenigüzel
 Yenikale
 Yenikasarcılar
 Yeniselimiye
 Yeşildere
 Yolüstü
 Yolveren
 Zincirliköprü

References

Districts of Rize Province